Baberowsee is a lake in Brandenburg, Germany. It is located in Kagel (Grünheide), an Ortsteil of the municipality of Grünheide, Oder-Spree district.

References 

Lakes of Brandenburg
Oder-Spree